Galina Vladimirovna Kozhevnikova (16 March 1974 in Kazan – 5 March 2011 in Moscow) was a Russian journalist and human rights activist. Galina Kozhevnikova was deputy director of the Moscow human rights center "Sova", a Russian non-governmental organization (NGO). She was known in Russia as a leading expert of problem of nationalism, researching xenophobia and ethnic hatred.

Biography

Education
Kozhevnikova completed Rossiyskiy Gosudarstvennyy Gumanitarnyy Universitet, Istoriko-Arkhivnyy Institut at faculty of history-archival studies in 1997, where she also continued studies at the academic department of history of government institutions and public organizations.

Work
Galina Kozhevnikova started first work at the Information and Research Center "Panorama" in 1995, researching issues of the activities of federal executive authorities and state authorities of the constituent entities in Russia. When, in 2002, with the help of "Panorama" and Moscow Helsinki Group, was created "Sova Center", a NGO, researching xenophobia and ethnic hatred, she continued there work as a leading researcher. While researching ethnic hatred at "Sova", she was often receiving threats. Galina Kozhevnikova was actively working at "Sova", despite her serious illness, until her death.

Death
Galina Kozhevnikova died from a long illness on March 5, 2011 at the age of 36. Her colleagues, expressing sympathies about her early death, said about Galina Kozhevnikova as a courageous researcher of nationalism and ethnic hatred in Russia. Tanya Lokshina, colleague from Human Rights Watch, said that Galina Kozhevnikova was a leading researcher of xenophobia in Russia, "She had a completely encyclopedic mind. She knew more about this topic than anyone else".

Publications
 Radical Nationalism in Russia in 2008, and Efforts to Counteract It

References

1974 births
2011 deaths
Writers from Kazan
Women historians
Women human rights activists
Russian human rights activists
Russian journalists
Russian State University for the Humanities alumni